Aivar Priidel (born 12 May 1977) is a football (soccer) midfielder from Estonia. He played for several clubs in his native country, including FC Levadia Tallinn.

International career
Priidel earned his first official cap for the Estonia national football team on 19 May 1995, when Estonia played Latvia at the Baltic Cup 1995. He obtained a total number of two caps. He currently belongs to the JK Retro football club.

References

External links

1977 births
Living people
Estonian footballers
Estonia international footballers
Association football midfielders
FCI Levadia Tallinn players
Footballers from Tallinn
Meistriliiga players